is a former Japanese football player.

Playing career
Kawaguchi was born in Nagasaki Prefecture on June 13, 1977. After graduating from Meiji University, he joined the J1 League club Avispa Fukuoka in 2000. He became a regular player as center back in the first half of the 2000 season. However he could not play much during the second half of the 2000 season and the club was relegated to the J2 League in 2002. However he did not play often and retired at the end of the 2002 season.

Club statistics

References

External links

1977 births
Living people
Meiji University alumni
Association football people from Nagasaki Prefecture
Japanese footballers
J1 League players
J2 League players
Avispa Fukuoka players
Association football defenders